Sir James Grant of Grant, 8th Baronet,  (19 May 1738, Moray – 18 February 1811, Castle Grant) was a Scottish landowner, politician and Chief of Clan Grant. He went by the nickname of the good Sir James.

Life
Grant was the son of Sir Ludovick Grant, 7th Baronet, and Lady Margaret Ogilvy, daughter of the statesman James Ogilvy, 1st Earl of Seafield. Born in Moray, Scotland, he was educated at Westminster School and Christ's College, Cambridge. Grant succeeded his father as Member of Parliament for Elginshire in 1761, a seat he held until 1768.

In 1773 Grant succeeded his father as eighth Baronet of Colquhoun. In 1783 he was a co-founder of the Royal Society of Edinburgh and served as its first Physical President.

From 1790 to 1795 he was MP for Banffshire. He also served as Lord Lieutenant of Inverness-shire. He was colonel of a fencible regiment, the Grant Fencible Regiment raised in 1793.

He died at the family seat of Castle Grant in February 1811, aged 72, and was succeeded by his son Lewis Alexander Grant, who later that year succeeded his second cousin as fifth Earl of Seafield.

Family
He married Jean Duff, daughter of Alexander Duff of Hatton, in 1763. They had 14 children, seven of whom survived to adulthood. She died in 1805.

Their children included Lewis Alexander Grant-Ogilvy, 5th Earl of Seafield FRSE (1767–1840) and Col Francis William Ogilvy-Grant, 6th Earl of Seafield (1778–1853).

His sister, Penuel Grant, married the Scottish author, Henry Mackenzie.

Grant was a cousin to James Lind.

See also
Grant or Strathspey Fencibles
Earl of Seafield

References

1738 births
1811 deaths
People from Moray
People educated at Westminster School, London
Alumni of Christ's College, Cambridge
Baronets in the Baronetage of Nova Scotia
Black Watch officers
Founder Fellows of the Royal Society of Edinburgh
Lord-Lieutenants of Inverness-shire
Members of the Parliament of Great Britain for Scottish constituencies
Members of the Philosophical Society of Edinburgh
Scottish antiquarians
Scottish clan chiefs
Scottish knights
Scottish landowners
Scottish soldiers
British MPs 1761–1768
British MPs 1790–1796
Politics of Aberdeenshire
Politics of Moray
Grant, James Grant, 3rd Lord
Fellows of the Society of Antiquaries of Scotland